Oscar James (born 25 July 1942) is a Trinidadian actor, who is based in the United Kingdom. He has had a long and varied career, but is best known for appearing on British television, in particular the BBC soap opera EastEnders, where he played original character Tony Carpenter for over two years. James resides in north London.

Early life 
James was born in Trinidad, and had a poor upbringing. He came to the United Kingdom in the 1950s. He initially worked as a taxi driver, a dish-washer and also a gymnast, but he always had aspirations to be an entertainer and followed his dream by becoming an actor.

Career 
Roles for black actors were sparse during James' early career, but he persevered to become the fourth black actor to join the Royal Shakespeare Company and the first black actor to play Macbeth.

In 1972, he co-founded with fellow actor Alton Kumalo the first black British theatre company, Temba (the name derived from the Zulu word for "hope"), initially to produce new black writing from Britain and South Africa. Temba staged the first British production of Athol Fugard's Sizwe Bansi is Dead.

James had early roles in television programmes such as Softly, Softly (1966); Love Thy Neighbour (1975); Quiller (1975); Till Death Us Do Part (1975); The Goodies (the 1975 episode "South Africa", in which he played Enoch Powell); Gangsters (1976); Angels (1976); The Professionals; Out (1978); Minder (1979); Shoestring (1980);
Tales of the Unexpected (1981)
and The Gentle Touch (1984).

He was the first black actor to appear in the ITV soap opera Emmerdale Farm in 1978 as Antony Moeketsi, an African teacher who taught Seth Armstrong to read. However, he is best known for his role as Tony Carpenter in the BBC television soap opera EastEnders. James was one of the original cast members, appearing in the series from its debut in 1985 until 1987.

Other TV credits include: Minder in the Series 1 episode "Come in T-64, Your Time Is Ticking Away" (1979), Casualty (1996), Lovejoy (1994), London's Burning (2002), Doctors (2002; 2005), The Bill (2006), Crocodile Shoes II (2006), The Line of Beauty (2006), Holby City (2006), Dream Team (2002), Afterlife (2005) and the television drama Angel Cake (2006). He has also appeared in several films, including the 1977 film Black Joy, where he played loan shark Jomo, and the 2005 Tim Burton adaptation of Charlie and the Chocolate Factory, where he played the shopkeeper in whose shop Charlie Bucket finds the final Golden Ticket.

In 2004, James played Herbert in Oxford Road: the Story, a radio play in which he worked alongside Doña Croll, an actress with whom he had previously worked in Kwame Kwei-Armah's play Elmina's Kitchen at the National Theatre. Elmina's Kitchen was adapted into a BBC Four televised film in 2005, in which James also starred.

Partial filmography
 A Matter of Choice (1963) - Dancing man at club (uncredited)
 Man in the Middle (1964) - Court Martial stenographer (uncredited)
 Never Mention Murder (1965) - Hospital Orderly (uncredited)
 Naked Evil (1966) - Dupree
 Carry on Up the Jungle (1970) - Nosha Warrior (uncredited)
 The Breaking of Bumbo (1970) - Second Student
 All the Right Noises (1971) - Guard
 Gumshoe (1971) - Azinge
 Pressure (1976) - Colin
 Black Joy (1977) - Jomo
 Jaguar Lives! (1979) - Collins
 Student Bodies (1981) - Football Coach
 Last Night at the Alamo (1983) - Dub
 Water (1985) - Miguel
 Three Kinds of Heat (1987) - Unle Joe
 Hardware (1990) - Chief
 My Kingdom (2001) - Desmond
 If Only (2004) - Superintendent
 Charlie and the Chocolate Factory (2005) - Shopkeeper
 Shoot the Messenger (2006) - Rodney Pascale
 Oh Happy Day (2007) - Storekeeper
 Deadmeat (2007) - Detective Peters

References

External links
 
 "Oscar James and Mustapha Matura in conversation", National Theatre, July 2013.

1942 births
Living people
Trinidad and Tobago male film actors
Trinidad and Tobago male stage actors
Trinidad and Tobago male television actors
Trinidad and Tobago taxi drivers
British male film actors
British male stage actors
British male soap opera actors
British taxi drivers
Royal Shakespeare Company members
Trinidad and Tobago emigrants to the United Kingdom
Black British male actors
20th-century Trinidad and Tobago male actors
21st-century Trinidad and Tobago male actors
20th-century British male actors
21st-century British male actors
21st-century Trinidad and Tobago actors
20th-century Trinidad and Tobago actors